Itarumã is a municipality in south Goiás state, Brazil. In 2020, it had a  population of 7,259.  Itarumã is a large producer of cattle with a herd of almost three hundred thousand head.

Location
Itarumã is located in the Quirinópolis Microregion and is connected by paved roads with Caçu, 40 kilometers to the north; and Itajá, 45 kilometers to the south.  It is 366 kilometers to the state capital, Goiânia, which is connected by  BR-060 / Abadia de Goiás / Guapó / Indiara / Acreúna / Rio Verde / GO-174 / GO-422 / Caçu / GO-206.  See Sepin for all the distances.

Municipal boundaries are with:
north:  Caçu, Serranópolis, and Jataí
south:  Itajá
east:  Limeira do Oeste (Minas Gerais)
west:  Aporé and Serranópolis

Demographics
Population density in 2007: 1.55 inhabitants/km2
Population growth rate 1996–2007: 1.00.%
Total population in 2007: 5,338
Total population in 1980: 5,579
Urban population in 2007: 3,479
Rural population in 2007: 1,859
Population change: the population has decreased by about 240 inhabitants since 1980.
Itarumã has one district:  Olaria do Angico

The economy
The economy is based on cattle raising and cultivation of soybeans, rice, corn, sugarcane, and beans.  The cattle herd is one of the largest in the state with 292,000 head.

Economic Data (2007)
Industrial establishments: 11
Retail establishments in 2007: 62
Dairies:  Laticínios ABC Ind. e Comércio Ltda. Parmalat Brasil S/A - Indústria de Alimentos. (22/05/2006)
Financial institutions:  Banco do Brasil S.A. (August/2007)
Automobiles: 373 (2007)

Main agricultural products in ha.(2006)
rice:        400
corn:      1,400
soybeans: 1,500

Farm Data (2006)in ha.
Number of farms:                411
Total area:                  254,132
Area of permanent crops:       123
Area of perennial crops:     263
Area of natural pasture:     206,464
Persons dependent on farming: 950
Farms with tractors:            146
Number of tractors:             211 IBGE

Education and Health
There were 4 schools (2006) and 1 hospital with 13 beds (2007).
Literacy Rate: 85.3%
Infant mortality rate: 28.88 (in 1,000 live births)
Ranking on the Municipal Human Development Index:  0.735 (medium)
State ranking:  126 (out of 242 municipalities in 2000)
National ranking:  2,307 (out of 5,507 municipalities in 2000) For a complete list see Frigoletto.com

History
The documented history of European settlement of Itarumã begins in 1874 when Heitor Severino built the first house of palm fronds.  The village was given the name of São Sebestião da Pimenta, honoring the saint and Dona Francisca Pimenta, a rich landowner of the region.  The district was created in 1901, belonging to Jataí, and on an unknown date the name was shortened to Pimenta.  In 1943 the name was changed to Itarumã.  In 1953 it was dismembered from Jataí and became a municipality.

See also
 List of municipalities in Goiás
Microregions of Goiás

References

Frigoletto
 Sepin

Municipalities in Goiás